Mirel Georgian Bolboașă (born 11 June 1989) is a Romanian professional footballer who plays as a goalkeeper for LPS HD Clinceni.

Honours
Argeș Pitești
Liga II: 2007–08

Petrolul Ploiești
Liga III: 2017–18

Astra Giurgiu
Cupa României runner-up: 2020–21

References

External links
 
 

1989 births
Living people
Sportspeople from Pitești
Romanian footballers
Association football goalkeepers
Liga I players
Liga II players
FC Argeș Pitești players
FC Viitorul Constanța players
FC Petrolul Ploiești players
FC Universitatea Cluj players
ASA 2013 Târgu Mureș players
FC UTA Arad players
FC Astra Giurgiu players
FC Hermannstadt players
LPS HD Clinceni players